Jaridat ar Rabita al Wataniya as Suriya ('Newspaper of the Syrian National League') was an Arabic-language newspaper published in Buenos Aires from 1929 to 1934. The paper was published by Khalil Saadeh, the father of Antun Saadeh.

References

Arabic-language newspapers
Defunct newspapers published in Argentina
Newspapers established in 1929
Publications disestablished in 1934
Mass media in Buenos Aires
Argentina–Syria relations